2U, Inc. is an American educational technology company that contracts with non-profit colleges and universities to build, deliver and support online degree and non-degree programs. The company is an online program manager (OPM), supplying its client institutions with a cloud-based software-as-a-service platform, coursework design, infrastructure support, and capital.

The company has been criticized for its online program manager contracts in which it licenses its courses, through a revenue-sharing agreement, to participating colleges and for its student recruitment practices.

History
2U was founded in 2008 by John Katzman (co-founder of The Princeton Review), originally naming it 2tor (pronounced "Tutor") after his dog Tor. Katzman recruited colleagues including Chip Paucek (former CEO of Hooked on Phonics), and technology entrepreneur Jeremy Johnson to be co-founders. Katzman became chairman, and Paucek became the company's CEO. 2U was started, in part, because its founders saw an opportunity due to the fact that few highly ranked universities offered online instruction. 2U is the third company that Paucek was involved in founding.

Katzman funded 2U in 2009 through the launch of its first online teaching degree with the University of Southern California (USC). In 2010, 2U partnered again with USC to offer an online degree in social work.

In 2011, Georgetown University's School of Nursing and Health partnered with 2U to offer a degree program. The Kenan-Flagler Business School at the University of North Carolina started offering an online MBA through 2U the same year.

In 2012, John Katzman left 2U to launch Noodle Partners.

By July 2013, the company had raised $10 million in venture capital.

In February 2014, 2U announced that Sallie Krawcheck, a former executive at Bank of America Corp. and Citigroup Inc., and Earl Lewis, president of the Andrew W. Mellon Foundation, were nominated to join the board of 2U. On March 28, 2U went public and raised $119 million by offering 9.2 million shares at $13 per share. By July, other schools such as Syracuse University, Northwestern University, and the University of California, Berkeley signed on with 2U to create online graduate degree programs.

In March 2015, Yale University and 2U announced that they were partnering in order to offer a full-time, online master of medical science degree. By 2015, about 12,300 students were enrolled in 2U partner programs.

Starting in 2017, 2U diversified its strategy and acquired education companies GetSmarter, and later Trilogy Education, firms offering short-term non-credit training programs. Also in 2017, Paucek earned an MBA online from the University of North Carolina at Chapel Hill, through the school's partnership with 2U. In late 2017, former Obama administration official Valerie Jarrett joined 2U's board.

In 2018, 2U launched the Harvard Business Analytics Program (HBAP) in conjunction with Harvard University. Students in this program had an average of 17.5 years of work experience, were an average of 42 years old, and paid $50,000 in tuition.

In early 2019, 2U announced that it had entered a partnership with EGADE Business School at Tecnológico de Monterrey in Mexico to offer an online MBA program. 2U also partnered with Tecnológico de Monterrey and the Washington University School of Law to offer an online master of laws program.  On August 6, 2U announced its first undergraduate program, offering a degree in data science and business analytics, as well as six other degrees, from the University of London (UoL), with its member institution London School of Economics (LSE). UoL, LSE and 2U planned to keep the cost of the three-year degree at $26,000, far lower than most of 2U's other programs. In September, 2U created a "Framework for Transparency", with a commitment to publishing transparent data on topics including university oversight and accountability, access, quality and outcomes.

In 2020, Senators Elizabeth Warren and Sherrod Brown called for 2U and four other online program managers to disclose the terms of their contracts with colleges and universities in order to determine whether they were violating laws meant to safeguard consumers from predatory enrollment practices.  In June, 2U announced that it would offer $3 million in scholarships in increments of $2,500 to under-represented demographics, and the recipients would have to demonstrate both need and merit. The scholarships could be applied to about 100 different programs with a strong emphasis on technical training. Later that year, 2U announced a partnership with Netflix and Norfolk State University, to offer free online tech bootcamps to current students and alumni.  In November, 2U published its first transparency report, which showed it had invested $1.3B in its non-profit partners' degree programs, and 72% of students graduate from those programs.

2U strongly benefited from the shift to online learning brought on by the response to COVID-19, with a large growth in gross revenue in 2020. The company also reduced its debt. 2U was servicing more than 275,000 students as of late 2020. 2U said that the pandemic also increased interest in its revenue-sharing pricing model from new and existing clients. Also in 2020, the London School of Economics agreed to expand its scope business with 2U to include two additional undergraduate degrees in mathematics and finance. In September, 2U and Columbia University's engineering school announced an expansion of their work together, where 2U would help launch the Columbia Artificial Intelligence Program, an online program targeted at working executives.

Before the start of the 2020–2021 academic year, Boston, Massachusetts-based Simmons University announced that it would be delivering hundreds of courses online in order to cope with the COVID-19 crisis. The expanded agreement with Simmons also provided for the creation of additional degree programs aimed at non-traditional students, with lower tuition than in-person programs. Simmons received services from 2U on a revenue-share basis.

In June 2021, 2U announced a strategic agreement with education assistance benefits manager Guild Education. The same year, 2U purchased massive open online course (MOOC) provider edX for $800 million cash. Also in June, Netflix and 2U announced an expansion of their boot camps for Talladega College, St. Edward's University, Marymount University, and Edward Waters College. In October 2021, Valerie Jarrett resigned from the 2U Board. In November, a Wall Street Journal expose found that 2U often used aggressive means to recruit students for the University of Southern California masters in social work and that "USC social-work graduates who took out federal loans borrowed a median $112,000. Half of them were earning $52,000 or less annually two years later."

On May 16, 2022, Bloomberg reported that Indian education tech company Byju's was in talks to acquire 2U, along with fellow US education technology company Chegg. In June 2022, it was reported that Byju's had put forward an offer of more than US$1 billion to acquire 2U. In July 28, 2022, Paucek announced that the company would layoff 20% of its workforce "across the board".

In December 2022, a class action suit was filed against 2U and the University of Southern California "defrauded students by using misleading U.S. News & World Report rankings to promote the courses."

Finances
2U's revenues in the quarter ending September 30, 2021 grew 16 percent year over year and the company experienced a net loss of $60 million. The company spent $346 million on marketing and advertising in the last 9 months. 2U last made a quarterly profit in December 2018. In 2021, 2U's largest outside shareholder is ARK Invest.

Business model 
2U operates as an online program manager. It does not confer degrees. Rather, it provides its clients with technology and other resources to create online classes and degree programs taught by the client institution's instructors with live video and recorded classes with multimedia presentations. The programs set-up by 2U and its clients generally have small class sizes and career services. Students meet remotely (i.e., in a live video chat room) with the professor and the other students. This approach has led to a student retention rate of 84 percent.

2U has about 70 clients, mostly highly regarded universities, including Harvard University, Yale University, MIT, University of Pennsylvania, Georgia Tech, University of California, Berkeley, and University of Texas.

2U signs long-term contracts, typically 10 years in length, with its client institutions. Students pay standard tuition. 2U gets paid through revenue sharing.

Subsidiaries

GetSmarter
In early 2017, as its first acquisition, 2U acquired GetSmarter for $103 million and a $20 million earn-out. GetSmarter was founded in 2008 in South Africa by Robert Paddock. It offers short-term online courses in partnership with major universities. In 2016, GetSmarter had $17 million in revenue and roughly 400 employees. At the time of its acquisition, GetSmarter continued to operate as an independent firm.

Trilogy Education Services

Trilogy Education Services is a New York City-based 2U subsidiary that offers non-credit professional training programs, colloquially known as coding bootcamps, through affiliate universities. In-person courses are held on the affiliate university campus. Revenue from the tuition is shared with the affiliate university. Graduates receive a professional certificate from the partner school and career counseling. The partner schools do not regard program graduates as university alumni.

Trilogy Education Services was founded in 2015. In June 2017, the company received $30 million in a Series A funding round, followed by $50 million in Series B funding round in May 2018. It was bought by 2U in April 2019 for $750 million in cash and stock.

edX

In 2021, 2U announced it would purchase edX, a MOOC provider created by MIT and Harvard in 2012. MOOCS like edX have typically had low completion rates. In the journal Science, Justin Reich and José Ruipérez-Valiente state that "MOOCs 'will not transform higher education and probably will not disappear entirely either." Instead, they predict that the field will coalesce 'around a different, much older business model: helping universities outsource their online master's degrees for professionals.'"

Recognition in the media
In May 2012, Forbes named 2U as one of the ten "Start-Ups Changing the World".

In 2014, Inc. Magazine named 2U one of ten "Tech Companies Helping Humanity".
 
In 2016, 2U was listed as a "Most Innovative Company" by Fast Company.

See also

For-profit higher education in the United States
online program manager

References

External links
 
 

Educational technology companies of the United States
Educational software companies
Learning management systems
Companies listed on the Nasdaq
Companies based in Prince George's County, Maryland
Lanham, Maryland
Education companies established in 2008
2014 initial public offerings
American companies established in 2008